The Niagara Peninsula Conservation Authority is one of 36  conservation authorities in the Canadian province of Ontario. It was established via the Conservation Authorities Act, and is a member authority of Conservation Ontario.

The authority is responsible for the management and protection of the watershed in the Niagara Peninsula, which includes the Niagara River, Welland River, and other bodies of water flowing into Lake Erie and Lake Ontario. It covers all of the Regional Municipality of Niagara and portions of Haldimand County and the city of Hamilton.

Conservation areas
The Niagara Peninsula Conservation Authority manages 41 conservation areas, including:

Ball’s Falls Conservation Area
Beamer Memorial Conservation Area
Binbrook Conservation Area
Binbrook Tract (wildlife and natural heritage refuge)
Canborough
Cave Springs
Chippawa Creek Conservation Area
Comfort Maple Conservation Area
EC Brown Conservation Area
Gainsborough Conservation Area
Gord Harry Trail
Hedley Forest Conservation Area
Humberstone Marsh Conservation Area
Jordan Harbour Conservation Area
Long Beach Conservation Area
Louth Conservation Area
Morgans Point Conservation Area
Mountainview Conservation Area
Mud Lake Conservation Area
Oswego Creek Conservation Area
Port Davidson Conservation Area
Rockway Conservation Area
Ruigrok Tract (wildlife and forest management area)
Shriners Creek (wildlife refuge and stormwater management area)
Smith Ness Conservation Area
Saint Johns Conservation Area
Stevensville Conservation Area
Two Mile Creek Conservation Area
Virgil Dams and Reservoirs Conservation Area
Wainfleet Bog Conservation Area
Wainfleet Wetlands Conservation Area
Willoughby Marsh Conservation Area
Woodend Conservation Area
Woolverton Conservation Area

External links

Conservation authorities in Ontario
Haldimand County
Hamilton, Ontario
Regional Municipality of Niagara